Peg o' My Heart is a 1933 American Pre-Code film adaptation of the play of the same name by J. Hartley Manners. It starred Marion Davies as a poor Irish girl, Margaret 'Peg' O'Connell, who stands to inherit a fortune if she satisfies certain conditions.

Plot summary

Sir Gerald Markham turns up with the news, telling Peg's father that she must spend three years in England learning to be a lady and remain separated from her father during this period. She is sent to London to live with her aunt, the penniless Mrs. Chichester, and her daughter, Ethel, and spoiled, over-indulged son, Alaric. The Chichesters put up with the arrangement because they are paid 5000 pounds a year for hosting Peg.

Cast
 Marion Davies as Margaret 'Peg' O'Connell
 Onslow Stevens as Sir Gerald Markham
 J. Farrell MacDonald as Patrick Shamus O'Connell
 Juliette Compton as Ethel Chichester
 Irene Browne as Mrs. Chichester
 Tyrell Davis as Alaric Chichester
 Alan Mowbray as Captain Christopher Brent
 Doris Lloyd as Mrs. Grace Brent
 Robert Greig as Jarvis the butler

References

External links

 
 
 
 

1933 romantic drama films
American films based on plays
American black-and-white films
Metro-Goldwyn-Mayer films
1933 films
Films directed by Robert Z. Leonard 
American romantic drama films
Films with screenplays by Frances Marion
Films with screenplays by J. Hartley Manners
1930s English-language films
1930s American films